Vellore Cantonment is a railway station that serves the city of Vellore, in addition to . The station is located on Viluppuram–Tirupati line. It is located at the heart of the city on Infantry road (near Vellore Municipal Corporation).

The station was originally served by a metre-gauge line. After a gauge conversion drive taken up by Southern Railways, the line was converted to a broad gauge in 2010. After gauge conversion the first train Rameswaram–Tirupati Express passed through this station in April 2011.

Facilities
Since this railway station is relatively new, not many facilities exist. A light refreshment functions on platform 1.

Connections
Taxis and Auto are other primary modes of transport.

References

Railway stations in Vellore district
Transport in Vellore
Trichy railway division